Blue Lick is an unincorporated community in Monroe Township, Clark County, Indiana, United States.

History
A post office was established at Blue Lick in 1837, and remained in operation until it was discontinued in 1905.

The community took its name from Blue Lick Creek. The creek was named for the blue slate in the riverbed.

Geography

References

Unincorporated communities in Clark County, Indiana
Unincorporated communities in Indiana
Louisville metropolitan area